Yevheniy Volodymyrovych Shevchenko (born May 4, 1972) is a Ukrainian lawyer, politician, and entrepreneur. He has served as a People's Deputy of Ukraine of the 9th convocation.

Biography
Graduated from Law Institute named after V. Stashys of Classic Private University as a lawyer.

Labour activity
Served in the army in Pryluky, Chernihiv Oblast, worked as an electrician on the collective farm.
Shevchenko held senior positions in such companies as ‘Eurocape New Energy’, ‘ECE Projektmanagement Gmb’, ‘Ahrostal’ and ‘Tsvietmiet’.

Political activity
During the 2012 Ukrainian parliamentary election and 2014 Ukrainian parliamentary election Shevchenko had failed to get elected to parliament. In 2012 he had gained 1,47% of the votes as an independent candidate in district № 75 located in Zaporizhzhia. In 2014 he was a candidate in district № 210 in Pryluky (Chernihiv Oblast) for Viola; this time he gained 0.31% of the vote.

During the presidential elections of 2019 was a trusted representative of the candidate Volodymyr Zelenskyy.
A candidate for people’s deputies from the political party ‘Servant of the People‘ in the 2019 parliamentary elections (the electoral district № 76, Voznesenivskyi and Khortytskyi districts of Zaporizhzhia), he won the constituency with 43% of the vote (Anatolii Pustovarov of Opposition Bloc placed second with 14,5% of the vote). At the time of the election: an individual entrepreneur, lives in Zaporizhzhia. Non-party.
In 2019 was elected a People’s Deputy of Ukraine, on 29 August took the oath at the meeting of the Verkhovna Rada of Ukraine (the Ukrainian parliament).
Faction: Member of the political party ‘Servant of the People’.
Post: Chairperson of the Sub-committee on Industrial Policy of the Verkhovna Rada of Ukraine Committee on Economic Development.
Head of the Sub-committee on Industrial Policy of the Verkhovna Rada of Ukraine Committee on Economic Development.
Head of a group for inter-parliamentary relations with Kazakhstan.
Member of a group for inter-parliamentary relations with Azerbaijan.
Member of a group for inter-parliamentary relations with China. 
Member of a group for inter-parliamentary relations with Singapore.
Member of a group for inter-parliamentary relations with Iraq.
Member of a group for inter-parliamentary relations with Georgia. 
Member of a group for inter-parliamentary relations with Switzerland.

On 24 May 2021 Shevchenko was expelled from the ‘Servant of the People’ faction due to his unauthorised visit/meeting of 20 April (2021) with President of Belarus Alexander Lukashenko.
On 7 March 2022 Shevchenko was detained at a border crossing in Ukraine fleeing the country despite decree on mobilization in Ukraine.

On 21 September 2022 Shevchenko joined the parliamentary group Restoration of Ukraine.

References

External links

1972 births
Living people
People from Melitopol
Servant of the People (political party) politicians
Ukrainian People's Party politicians
Ninth convocation members of the Verkhovna Rada
21st-century Ukrainian politicians